The following is a compilation of notable records and statistics of teams, players and seasons in Primera División.

All time League Records

Titles
Most top-flight League titles: 17, C.D. FAS
Most consecutive League titles: 7,
Hércules (Amateur Era) 1927, 1928, 1929–30, 1930–31, 1931–32, 1932–33, 1933–34
Atlético Marte (Professional Era) 3- 1955, 1955–56 and 1956–57
Firpo (Professional Era) 3- 1990, 1991 and 1992–93

Top flight appearances
 Most Appearances: 64
 C.D. FAS (1948–present)

Records

Team
 Most league goals scored in a season: 88, Atletico Marte (1978-1979)
 Fewest league goals scored in a season: 8, Juventud Olimpica Metalio (1999 Apertura)
 Most league goals conceded in a season: 111, Cojutepeque F.C. (1994–95)
 Fewest league goals conceded in a season:,
 Biggest Win: C.D. Luis Angel Firpo 11-0 Cojutepeque F.C., 30 April 1995
 Best undefeated streak: Atletico Marte 20 games (10 wins and 10 draws), 1985 season
 First team that bought another team spot in the Primera División : Atlético Constancia buying Once Municipal for 1 colon in 1958.
 Most consecutive games won at home: 31 games Once Municipal (2016/2017) and Santa Tecla F.C. (2017/2018)

Individual
 Highest goal scorer of all time: Williams Reyes, 251 goals (2001-)

 First coach that has won a championship: Armando Chacón with Once Municipal in 1949.
 First foreign coach that's won a championship: Argentinian Alberto Cevasco with C.D. FAS in 1957-58.
 Most championship by a coach: Edwin Portillo won 7 titles with A.D. Isidro Metapan
 Most championship by a foreign coach: Chilean Hernán Carrasco Vivanco won 6 titles (Alianza-1965–66, 1966–67 and 1989–90, Atletico Marte -1968–69 and 1970, Aguila -1987–88)
 Most relegation by a team: 4, C.D. Dragon (1963/64, 1980–81, 1990–91, 2002-2003) and Once Municipal (1969–70, 1979–80, 2007–08 and 2012–13)
 Most goals scored in a game by one player : 7, Mario Aguila Zelaya with Firpo against Olimpic 7-0 (24 December 1950)
 Most goals by a top goalscorer: Argentinian Omar Muraco with 26 goals in 1958. 
 Youngest player to play in the Primera División:  14 years old Ricardo Guevara Mora with Platense
 Oldest player in the Primera División: 43 years, 11 months and 1 day Magico Gonzales with San Salvador F.C. in 2002.
 First world cup champion player in the Primera División: Brazilian Zozimo played with C.D. Aguila in 1967–1969 (Champion with Brazil in Sweden 1958 and Chile 1962) 
 First world cup player in the Primera División: Paraguayan Jorge Lino Romero played in the 1958 world cup with Atlante

Records 1927–1997 
 Most league goals scored in a season (excluding playoffs): 83 goals, Alianza F.C. (1965–66)
 Fewest league goals scored in a season: 11, C.D. Sonsonate (1977–1978)
 Most league goals conceded in a season: 111, Cojutepeque F.C. (1994–1995)
 Fewest league goals conceded in a season: 6, C.D. FAS (1981)
 Biggest Win: C.D. Luis Angel Firpo 11-0 Cojutepeque F.C., 30 April 1995
 Record away win:
 Highest scoring game:
 Most wins in a row:
 Longest Undefeated streak: Atletico Marte 20 games, 1985 season
 Most championship won by a player:
 Most Championship by a coach:
 Longest Period of time by a coach (in the first division):
 Most consecutive championship: 7, Hércules (1927, 1928, 1929–30, 1930–31, 1931–32, 1932–33, 1933–34)
 Most seasons appearance: 64, C.D. FAS (1948–present)
 Most participants from one place: 
 Most points in a season: 50 points, Alianza (1965–1966) and Juventud Olimpica (1971)
 Fewest points in a season: 2 points, San Jacinto (1950–51)
 Most Goals scored in a finals game:
 Most goals scored in a final game:
 Highest scoring game in a finals game:
 Most appearances (team) in the finals:
 Most defeats in a final series:
 Most defeats in a final:
 Most appearances in a final series without winning a championship:
 Lowest ranked winners:
 Lowest ranked finalists:
 Biggest win (aggregate): 
 Most final series goals by an individual:
 Most goals by a losing side in a final game:
 Lowest finish by the previous season's champions:
 C.D. Aguila, C.D. Platense Municipal Zacatecoluca and Alianza F.C. that have won a championship in the season following their promotion to the Primera. They did so in
 Highest goal scorers during this period: David Arnoldo Cabrera, 240 goals (1967–1987)

Records Clausura and Apertura (1998–) 
 Most league goals scored in a season (excluding playoffs): 49, C.D. Aguila  (Apertura 2001)
 Fewest league goals scored in a season: 8, C.D. Juventud Olímpica Metalio (1999 Apertura)
 Most league goals conceded in a season: 53, C.D. San Clara (2000 Apertura)
 Fewest league goals conceded in a season:9 (occurred three times), C.D. FAS (2009 Apertura), and C.D. Aguila twice (2009 Apertura & Clausura 2010)
 Biggest Win:
 Record away win:
 Highest scoring game:
 Most wins in a row:
 Best start to a season: Municipal Limeno 6 straight wins (Apertura 2000)
 Worst start to a season: UES 6 straight defeats (Clausura 2014)
 teams with the fewest wins in a season: Municipal Limeno (Apertura 2004) and Alacranes del Norte (Clausura 2010) with 0 games.

 Best undefeated streak: FAS (2003 season) and Isidro Metapan (2002 season) 18 games
 Most losses in a row: Once Municipal  from round 12 Apertura 2012 to round 2 Clausura 2013 (9 games)
 Most championship won by a player: 10 by Hector Omar Mejia with A.D. Isidro Metapan.
 Most Championship by a coach: 7 by Edwin Portillo with A.D. Isidro Metapan.
 Longest period of time by a coach:
 Most consecutive championship won under the Clausura/ Apertua Format: 5 ( Clausura 2002, Apertura 2002, Apertura 2003, Clausura 2004, Clausura 2005,), C.D. FAS 
 Most seasons in an Apertura/Clausura format:
 Fewest appearances in an Apertura/Clausura format:
 Most participants from one place: 
 Most points in a season: 44 points, C.D. FAS (2003 Clausura)
 Fewest points in a season: 5 points (twice), Alcranes del Norte (Clausura 2010) and Once Municipal (Apertura 2012)
 Most Goals scored in a finals game: 
 Top goalscorer in a final game: Williams Reyes 7 goals
 Most appearances in a grand final: 14, Alfredo Pacheco, Marvin Gonzalez, Cristiam Alvarez
 Most appearances in a final game:  Williams Reyes y Alejandro Bentos
 Highest scoring game in a finals game:
 Most appearances (team) in the finals: 25 times Firpo (as of Apertura 2012)
 Most defeats in a final series: 23, Firpo (as of Apertura 2012)
 Most defeats in a final: 8, C.D. FAS (as of Apertura 2012)
 Most appearances in a final series without winning a championship: 7, C.D. Municipal Limeno
 Lowest ranked winners:
 Lowest ranked finalists:
 Biggest win (aggregate): 6 (twice), A.D. Isidro Metapan 6-0 Nejapa F.C. (Clausura 2009)  C.D. Municipal Limeno 7-1 Atletico Balboa (Clausura 2000)
 Most final series goals by an individual:
 Most goals by a losing side in a final game: 
 C.D. Vista Hermosa is the only team that have won a championship in the season following their promotion to the Primera. They did so in
 Lowest finish by the previous season's champions: Dragon 11th (Apertua 2016)
 Most goals scored by Goalkeeper: Alvaro Misael Alfaro (31 goals)
 Fastest goal scored in the tournament: Uruguayan Jorge Garay with Dragon in 7 seconds.
 First goal scored in clausura-apertura format: Magdonio Corrales with C.D. Municipal Limeno in 1998 against Santa Clara.
 First red card given in the clausura-apertura format: Mario Elías Guevara with Alianza F.C. in 1998 against C.D. Dragon
 Player with appearance with the most team: Julio Castro with 11 clubs (ADET, Arcense, San Salvador FC, Firpo, Alianza, Metapán, Águila, Balboa, Once Municipal, UES and FAS)
 Player with most own goals: Selvin Zepeda with 5 goals (2 with ADET, 1 with San Salvador FC, Nejapa and Alacranes del Norte)
 Youngest player to score a hat-trick: Colombian Bryan Gil for FAS against El Vencedor (18 Years and 4months)
 lowest game attendance in the Primera División: Alacranes del Norte-Metapán with 66 peoples in the Clausura 2010. the locals lost 881 dollars/\.
 Highest grand final attendance in the Primera División: 34, 212 people between FAS and Aguila (2003 Apertura)

Goalscorers Record

Top goal scorers of all time

Top goal scorers in the League Format

Top goal scorers in the Apertura/Clausura Format

Note: Players in bold text are still active in the Primera División.

Last updated: 6 May 2013 (after round 18 of the Clausura championship).  Source:

Appearances Record

Top Appearances in the Apertura/Clausura Format

Note: Players in bold text are still active in the Primera División.

Last updated: 13 April 2013 (after round 13 of the Clausura championship).  Source:

External links
 http://www.edhdeportes.com/articulo/los-records-del-futbol-salvadoreno-13243

Salvadoran Primera División